Dardanelle High School is a comprehensive public secondary school located in Dardanelle, Arkansas, United States, for students in grades nine through twelve.  Dardanelle is the sole high school administered by the Dardanelle School District and serves three counties in the Arkansas River Valley area and as the main feeder school for Dardanelle Middle School. The school is known as the only high school with the Sand Lizard as its school mascot.

Curriculum
The assumed course of study for students is to complete the Smart Core curriculum developed by the Arkansas Department of Education (ADE), which requires students complete at least 22 units for graduation. Course offerings include regular and Advanced Placement classes and exams with opportunities for college credit via AP exam or via concurrent credit at University of Arkansas Community College at Morrilton (UACCM) and Arkansas Tech University (ATU). The school is accredited by the ADE.

Dardanelle High School participates in the EAST Initiative. In 2008 and 2011, Dardanelle High School was honored as the EAST Founder's Award.

Athletics 
The Dardanelle High School mascot is the Sand Lizard with the school colors of red and white.

For the 2012-2014 seasons, the Dardanelle Sand Lizards participate in the 4A Region 4 Conference. Competition is primarily sanctioned by the Arkansas Activities Association with student-athletes competing in baseball, basketball (boys/girls), competitive cheer, competitive dance, football, golf (boys/girls), soccer (boys/girls), softball, tennis (boys/girls), track and field (boys/girls), volleyball and wrestling.

Each year, Dardanelle and rival Danville High School football teams compete for the (Yell County) Judge's Cup.

Notable people 

 Tom Cotton: United States Senator
 Henderson M. Jacoway (1887): United States Representative
 James Lee Witt (1962): Former FEMA Director
 Matt Zimmerman: Basketball coach
 John Daly: Professional Golfer

References

External links
 

Public high schools in Arkansas
Schools in Yell County, Arkansas
Dardanelle, Arkansas